The 1978–79 Iona Gaels men's basketball team represented Iona College during the 1978–79 NCAA Division I men's basketball season. The Gaels, led fourth-year by head coach Jim Valvano, played their home games at the Hynes Athletic Center. The Gaels received a bid to the 1979 NCAA tournament. Competing as the No. 8 seed in the East region, the Gaels were defeated by No. 9 seed and eventual Final Four participant Penn in the opening round.

Roster

Schedule and results

|-
!colspan=9 style=| Regular season

|-
!colspan=9 style=| NCAA tournament

Rankings

References

Iona Gaels men's basketball seasons
Iona
Iona